The men's high jump at the 2014 IPC Athletics European Championships was held at the Swansea University Stadium from 18–23 August.

Medalists

Results

T12

T42

T44

T47

See also
List of IPC world records in athletics

References

high jump
High jump at the World Para Athletics European Championships